Đồng Tháp is a province in the Mekong Delta and Plain of Reeds region of southern Vietnam. Đồng Tháp is  from Ho Chi Minh City, bordered by Pray Veng province (Cambodia) in the north with a length of more than ; Vĩnh Long and Cần Thơ in the south; An Giang in the west; and Long An and Tiền Giang in the east.

History
Đồng Tháp is a newly cultivated area from the 17th and 18th centuries, under the Nguyễn lords. The foundation of this area adhered to a powerful struggling history against nature, dangerous animals and aggressors.

The south of Đồng Tháp province whose center is Sa Đéc plays a very significant role. Many researchers have shown that overseas Vietnamese got to go to Sa Đéc for reclaiming and setting up hamlets between the late 17th century and the early 18th century. Sa Đéc is a Khmer word meaning "iron market". Some questions about this market, such as whether it sold iron agricultural tools or whether the frame of the market was made of iron, has not had any reasonable explanation; however, Sa Đéc is probably considered the newest area on the way to develop the country in 1757 led by Nguyễn Cư Trinh, a mandarin who was known for his achievement in reassuring people in Quảng Ngãi.

After the civil war between the Nguyễn Ánh and Tây Sơn siblings, Gia Long was on the throne to help stabilize Sa Đéc and made it become a part of Vĩnh An district. Sa Đéc, then with a favorable geographical location, did become the most crowded trading center of the Mekong Delta at that time, only smaller than Cholon within Saigon.

Cao Lãnh, located to the north of Tiền river, also has a glorious history. It is recorded in historical books that at the end of the 17th century, or early in the 18th century, some overseas Vietnamese at Bả Canh hamlet (currently belonging to Đập Đá commune, Đập Đá town, Bình Định province) came to cultivate and settled down near Cái Sao Thượng rivulet, forming the Bả Canh commune. Nguyễn Tú was accredited with having gathered people, cultivated and set up hamlets. He was elevated to the status of Tiền Hiền - an anciently righteous person - of the village. Nowadays, that stele has been found near Đình Trung bridge, Ward 2, Cao Lãnh city.

Cao Lãnh, since 30 April 1975, has been merged with Sa Đéc to become Đồng Tháp Province.

Geography

Topography

Climate
The whole of Đồng Tháp is in the tropical climate zone. There are two main seasons; a rainy season from May to November, and a dry season from December to April. Such climate is fairly advantageous for agricultural development. The hydrology of the province is under the influence of three factors: floodwater from the upper Mekong River, in-field rain and the tides of the East Sea. The hydrological regime is divided into two seasons: an exhausted season from December to June and a flood season from July to November.

Administrative divisions
Đồng Tháp is subdivided into 12 district-level sub-divisions:

 10 districts:
 Cao Lãnh
 Châu Thành
 Hồng Ngự
 Lai Vung
 Lấp Vò
 Tam Nông
 Tân Hồng
 Thanh Bình
 Tháp Mười
 3 provincial cities:
 Cao Lãnh City (capital of province)
 Hồng Ngự City
 Sa Đéc City

They are further subdivided into nine commune-level towns (or townlets), 129 communes, and 14 wards.

Table of local government divisions

Vehicle registration plate 
 Cao Lãnh City: 66-P1 XXX.XX, 66-P2 XXX.XX
 Cao Lãnh District: 66-F1 XXX.XX
 Châu Thành: 66-C1 XXX.XX
 Sa Đéc City: 66-S1 XXX.XX
 Lai Vung: 66-L1 XXX.XX
 Lấp Vò: 66-V1 XXX.XX
 Hồng Ngự city: 66-H1 XXX.XX
 Hồng Ngự district: 66-G1 XXX.XX
 Tân Hồng: 66-K1 XXX.XX
 Thanh Bình: 66-B1 XXX.XX
 Tháp Mười: 66-M1 XXX.XX
 Tam Nông: 66-N1 XXX.XX

Transport
Highway 80, Highway 30, Highway 54, Highway N2

Economy

Growth of agriculture and aquaculture
Enjoying a temperate climate, wide irrigation system, permanent freshwater source supplied by the Tiền and Hậu rivers, and rich river deposits, the agriculture of Đồng Tháp keeps growing. At present, Đồng Tháp is the 3rd largest rice paddy in Vietnam with a planted area of 462,042 ha and paddy output of more than 2.8 million tons. Apart from rice, the province also has more than 38,000 ha for secondary and annual industrial crops. Some farm produce zones across the Tiền and Hậu rivers have been built up as specializing areas which supply agricultural products to serve the need of processing and export.

The Sa Đéc flower village – one of the largest flower villages in Vietnam, at nearly 300 ha wide – provides more than 12 million types of flower and ornamental plant, both locally and overseas every year, taking up a significant proportion of the economic growth target of the province. The village has been further invested to enhance its quality, preserve and develop particular local flowers, and apply advanced biotechnology in breeding to raise floriculture as a potential line of production and develop it to be one of the major ecotourism sites of the province. The Sa Đéc flower village has attracted a large number of tourists, considered one of the most-visited destinations before the Lunar New Year. The tourists can admire the beauty of many different kinds of beautiful flowers blooming and enjoy the New Year atmosphere at the largest supplier of flowers for the southern region during Tết.

Đồng Tháp is also well known for fruits such as the Cao Lãnh mango, Lai Vung mandarin, Châu Thành longan and Phong Hoà grapefruit (able to produce fruit during the year), which bring about high economic values for gardeners. Fruit trees' output can reach more than 150,000 tons per annum. Within the province, there are various typical orchards having been specialized to produce consistent quality fruits, which aims at building up brand names and meeting export requirements.

With a large river body, fishery, after rice, is another important industry of the province. Aquaculture is widely developed all over the region, especially catfish and blue-legged prawn. The water surface area for aquatic breeding reaches 5,285 ha, where farmers focus on breeding prawns in rice fields and fish in warps along the Tiền and Hậu rivers. Each year, Đồng Tháp supplies over 290,000 tons of fish and a thousand tons of blue-legged prawns for export processing, accomplishing an export turnover of US$100 million.

Culture

Buddhism
Đồng Tháp has, since December 22, 2008, the largest Buddha statue of the Mekong Delta, built in Quan Âm Pagoda: "The sculpture, 32 meters long and weighing 100 tons, is that of Buddha lying on his side on a lotus petal, his right arm supporting his head and his left arm lying along his body. Buddhist scriptures say the Buddha assumed this position when he attained Nirvana, the release from the cycle of death and rebirth of an enlightened person. Thich Giac An of Quan Âm Pagoda, which from today will be home to the statue, said many Buddhists and locals contributed the 2,000 sacks of cement, five tons of iron and many other necessary materials worth VND1.6 billion (US$94,000) needed to build the statue. Quan Âm Pagoda, founded 200 years ago by a mandarin named Tran Quy Tanh, receives many devotees from across the country for major Buddhist festivals."

Tourism
Generous natural conditions and a submerged inland ecosystem have awarded Đồng Tháp with multiple valuable ecotourism resources, for example, Tràm Chim National Park, known both locally and internationally. This is a miniature ecological model of Đồng Tháp Mười and the habitat of red-head cranes – a precious bird species protected by the world. Tràm Chim National Park also achieves 7 out of 9 criteria in the Ramsar list of wetlands of international importance. Also of importance is the Gáo Giồng ecotourism site. This is a 2,000 ha complex of cajeput forest where more than 15 species of precious bird live, nest and lay eggs. Additionally, the site offers a rich variety of aquatic resources.

Situated by the bank of the Tiền River, the flower village of Sa Đéc is the homeland of hundreds of "uncanny flowers and strange herbs". The village – one of the flower centers in the south of Vietnam – covers an area of around 300 ha for planting flowers and ornamental trees. Here, scarce and priceless bonsai hundreds of years old can be seen. In addition to the economic importance shown in high incomes brought to the regional economy, Sa Đéc flowers also include cultural, art, esthetic and environmental-protecting values. Having been planned for construction, the Sa Đéc flower village will soon become an interesting tourist site bearing original particularities of the Mekong Delta.

Đồng Tháp also has a long-term history with different cultural and historical relics. The Gò Tháp historic site is a national cultural and historic site with a complex of 5 typical relics: Gò Tháp Mười, Co Tu Towel, tomb and monument of Đốc binh Kiều, Gò Minh Sư and Bà Chúa Xứ Temple. Archaeologists have also discovered the Óc Eo cultural relics of the Phù Nam Kingdom, which existed around 1,500 years ago. Gò Tháp, in the centre of the vast Đồng Tháp Mười, still maintains a wide ecological environment and beautiful landscapes. The Ministry of Culture – Sports and Tourism has approved the project of constructing an ecotourism site in Gò Tháp with recreational areas, including a 10-storey Lotus culinary tower, Tháp Mười wildlife conservation and showroom site, a historical and religious relics preservation and introduction site and an ecological site with various lotus ponds, cajeput forests and bird grounds and fishing. The south regional committee relic is anticipated to be built and restored. Moreover, Gò Tháp festival (occurring in March and November each year) with cultural and art activities and a folk festive atmosphere has become a remarkable event in the southern provinces, which attracts hundreds of thousands of visitors. Meeting spiritual needs of all levels, religious and cultural tourism in Gò Tháp is an interesting and particular form of tourism which has a potential to grow. Xẻo Quýt relic – the revolutionary base during the US resistance war of wetlands – is covered with 20 ha of primary cajeput forest and contains relics restoring part of the historical period of the previous Kiến Phong provincial committee.

The revered Nguyễn Sinh Sắc historical site with an extended area of nearly 11 ha located in Cao Lãnh city is a construction work to commemorate Nguyễn Sinh Sắc – the father of President Ho Chi Minh. Within the site, the ancient Hòa An traditional village is also restored with Cái Tôm canal, garden, coconut trees, plum trees, mango trees, monkey bridge, bamboo bridge, village wandering paths along the site, especially ancient houses such as "Dinh"-like (a Chinese character) houses, Bat Dan house, San house and Nóc Ngừa house.

In Đồng Tháp, tourists can do activities such as listening to sweet and tormenting Đồng Tháp chanteys on borderless lotus fields or rice fields, visiting the ancient architecture remains of sites such as Kiến An Cung Pagoda (Ong Quach pagoda), Gò Quản Cung – Giồng Thị Đạm monument, Đốc Binh Vàng Palace worshipping Trần Văn Năng, a famous general, or visiting places such as Mỹ An crane garden.

Traditional trade villages is one of the strengths to developing tourism in Đồng Tháp such as: Định Yên mats, Rạch Bà Đài building yard village, Long Thuận towel weaving village, Hồng Ngự fish breeding village, specialties such as Lai Vung mandarin, Châu Thành longan, Cao Lãnh mango, Phong Hòa grapefruit, Lai Vung nem (fermented pork), Hòa An plum, Sa Giang shrimp cracker, and Sa Đéc noodle, and folk dishes such as grilled field mice, "dien dien" flower sour soup, braised anabas fish in clay pot, grilled snakehead fish in young lotus leaf, snakes, frogs, and pickled mud fish are also advantages for tourism that attract visitors to come and enjoy.

Lotus has long been a particular plant of Đồng Tháp Mười, which is now invested to plant in centralization to take seeds for export.

Large-scale tourism investment projects are being implemented such as Bau Dong tourism site near Dinh Ba border gate, Mekong tourism site – Hồng Ngự town and the wet rice culture tourism rite of Lấp Vò district, which will create a difference for Đồng Tháp tourism products from others in the Mekong Delta once they are completed.

References

External links
 

 
Provinces of Vietnam